William Prado (born January 19, 1988) is an American professional  soccer player.

Career

College and amateur
Prado played two years of college soccer at Long Beach City College in 2009 and 2010, before moving to Concordia University for 2011 and 2012.
Prado, a 2011 and 2012 NAIA All-American, finished his Concordia career with a school record 30 assists to go along with 20 goals. In 2011 Prado set the school single season record with 18 assists which was also tops in the NAIA that year. Prado finished his Concordia career 6th all-time in points with 70. He was also a 2011 and 2012 All-GSAC First Team selection and 2012 NAIA All-Tournament team.

Professional career
Prado signed with USL Pro club Charlotte Eagles on March 5, 2013. He made his pro debut on April 13, 2013, in a 2–0 victory over Antigua Barracuda FC.[3]

After one season with Charlotte, he joined Orange County Blues FC, near his hometown, for the 2014 season.

References

1988 births
Living people
American soccer players
Charlotte Eagles players
Orange County SC players
Soccer players from California
USL Championship players
Association football midfielders